Trombidium latum is a species of mite in the genus Trombidium in the family Trombidiidae. It is found in Europe.

Name
The species name is derived from Latin latus "wide, broad".

References
 Synopsis of the described Arachnida of the World: Trombidiidae

Further reading
  (1837): Übersicht des Arachnidensystems. PDF

Trombidiidae
Animals described in 1837
Arachnids of Europe